The men's elimination race competition at the 2018 UEC European Track Championships was held on 7 August 2018.

Results

References

Men's elimination race
European Track Championships – Men's elimination race